Tron Øgrim (27 June 1947 – 23 May 2007) was a Norwegian journalist, author and politician. He was active in Socialist Youth Union (later Red Youth) from 1965  to 1973, and a central figure in the Workers' Communist Party from 1973 to 1984. In addition to being a politician, Øgrim was an author of political works and several science fiction novels. He was notable for communicating in a non-standard eastern Oslo dialect, even where he might have been expected to use standardized Bokmål.

Politics and journalism 
Born in Oslo, Øgrim was one of the most influential people in Norway's Marxist-Leninist movement in the sixties and seventies. He was one of the founders of the Workers' Communist Party, a party that strongly advocated the Chinese branch of communism. Tron was also central in founding the newspaper Klassekampen and in the publishing house Oktober.

Becoming a journalist after leaving politics in the eighties, Øgrim had a technology column in the Norwegian edition of PC World. He was known for his distinct writing style, where he rejected standard written Norwegian and, instead, wrote as he spoke, in a working class dialect. He also wrote science fiction novels under the pseudonym Eirik Austey.

Tron Øgrim was an early proponent of the Internet in Norway, frequently traveling around the country giving lectures. In 1995, he argued for the Norwegian parliament to establish an Internet presence, claiming: "Without politicians online, there is no such thing as a democratic IT policy." Øgrim was also a supporter of the open-source movement. In his book Kvikksølv, he described Linux as "applied communism". He was a mainstay contributor of the Internet newsgroup Leftist Trainspotters, where he made thousands of posts, many relating to the political developments in Nepal.

Esperanto movement 
A longstanding member of the Norwegian Esperanto League (Norsk Esperanto-Forbund), he never, however, accepted any formal position in the organization. Tron Øgrim was well known in the Esperanto movement for his radio series Drømmen om den fullkomne språk (The dream of a perfect language). Beginning in 1989, the programs dealt with linguistic philosophy and planned or constructed languages such as Esperanto and Volapük. He steadily turned up at international Esperanto meetings and was widely regarded as affable and scholarly, with a healthy portion of self-deprecation.

At his memorial service Leikny Øgrim told of growing up with a big brother who would read the dictionary from beginning to end and who from reading even the telephone book could learn something to relate to acquaintances. Douglas Draper, secretary of the Norwegian Esperanto League, also delivered a short talk on behalf of the NEL, by turns bantering and earnest. He said there were three kinds of Esperantists. There were active members engaged in management and organizational duties. There were passive members satisfied with paying their dues. Then there was Tron Øgrim. It might happen that for long periods the NEL would hear nothing from him; then he would telephone to ask: "Skylder jeg noe gryn?" ("Do I owe any groats?"—i.e., membership dues.) He might show up at the NEL office in Oslo and purchase not one or two books, but a whole load. While most Esperantists would plan their trips to major Esperanto congresses more than six months in advance, Tron might call up three days before the start of the event and ask what he could do to help out.

Norwegian Wikipedia work 

Tron Øgrim became a contributor on Wikipedia in December 2005, when libelous statements about a colleague appeared in a Norwegian Wikipedia article. Øgrim continued as a Wikipedia editor after the issue was resolved, writing about constructed languages through most of 2006. In the fall of 2006, his focus changed to Nepal generally and the history of communism in Nepal specifically. Øgrim was known in the Norwegian wikicommunity for writing very long articles about somewhat obscure topics. He also cared much about smaller wikis and their progress. He was routinely posting messages about milestones at the Norwegian Village Pump, as well as participating on the Wikimedia News announcements page.

Norwegian computer science lecturer Gisle Hannemyr remembers Øgrim as one of the most active Norwegian Wikipedia editors who chose Wikipedia as a platform for disseminating knowledge. Besides his articles on Nepal, he wrote on constructed languages like Esperanto and on many other topics. Hannemyr said: "I also believe that he was Norway's first blogger, with his site Under en stein i skogen ('Under a stone in the forest')." His website archives 107 of his posted articles, written in his East-Oslo idiolect. "He was absolutely a person who understood technology and how technology changes society," added Hannemyr.

Tron Øgrim was extremely important for the Norwegian wiki movement, and he was often interviewed by the press about Wikipedia. He gave a lecture about Wikipedia when Wikipedia's co-founder Jimmy Wales visited Norway in May 2006. When journalists challenged him about the sometimes erroneous information that the encyclopedia presents, Øgrim responded that by itself that was not a problem – on the contrary it may be viewed as an advantage: "Wikipedia asks everybody to do a checkup of their own information and not accept anything on face value. If you ask me, it is a democratic problem that so little awareness of source criticism exists today in the Norwegian school system."

Death and legacy 
Øgrim was found dead by one of his three daughters on 23 May 2007 in Oslo. The probable cause of death was a stroke.

The Wikipedia in Norwegian website honored Øgrim by displaying (on its pages) its logo with a Norwegian flag at half mast in the foreground, for one day.

See also 
 List of Wikipedia people

References

Bibliography 
 Marxismen – vitenskap eller åpenbaringsreligion? (1979)
 Den vestlige maoismens sammenbrudd og krisa i AKP (m-l) (1982)
 Tyskeren mot Stretermish (1985), as Eirik Austey
 Grisen før jul. Harde tider på vei i det rike Vest-Europa (1985)
 På sporet etter det ukjente dyret (1990), as Eirik Austey
 Fallet (1990), as Eirik Austey
 Blått glass (1991), as Eirik Austey
 Akersgata og det blodige barnet (1993)
 Hilsen til en generasjon av kvikksølv! Løgnaktige spådommer om datarevolusjonen, verden, Norge og deg (1997)
 Tron Øgrim treffer 10 sportsgærninger (1998)
 Hilsen til en generasjon av kvikksølv: åssen IT forandrer verden og livet (2000)

External links 
 
 http://klassekampen.no/60309/article/item/null/dragkamp-om-ogrim

1947 births
2007 deaths
Norwegian Esperantists
Norwegian male writers
Norwegian columnists
Norwegian political writers
Norwegian bloggers
Workers' Communist Party (Norway) politicians
Norwegian communists
Anti-revisionists
Writers from Oslo
Wikipedia people
Male bloggers
20th-century Norwegian journalists